Jonathan Dove  (born 18 July 1959) is an English composer of opera, choral works, plays, films, and orchestral and chamber music.  He has arranged a number of operas for English Touring Opera and the City of Birmingham Touring Opera (now Birmingham Opera Company), including in 1990 an 18-player two-evening adaptation of Wagner's Der Ring des Nibelungen for CBTO.  He was Artistic Director of the Spitalfields Festival from 2001 to 2006.

Dove was born in London; both his parents were architects. He studied music at the University of Cambridge, under Robin Holloway, and afterwards worked as a freelance arranger and accompanist until 1987, when he was employed by Glyndebourne Opera.

In 1998  Dove was joint winner of the Christopher Whelen Award for his work in the fields of theatre music and opera. He was appointed Commander of the Order of the British Empire (CBE) in the 2019 Birthday Honours for services to music.

Productions
Productions of Dove's works include:

Airport Scenes, an orchestral suite from the airport-comedy opera Flight, was premiered by the University of Warwick Symphony Orchestra on 7 March 2006.
The Australian premiere (the Glyndebourne Festival Opera production) of Flight in March 2006, at the Adelaide Festival under the artistic direction of Brett Sheehy, won Australia's Best Opera award at the national Helpmann Awards
The Enchanted Pig, libretto by Alasdair Middleton, was premièred at the Young Vic, London in December 2006 and toured parts of the UK in early 2006
The Adventures of Pinocchio, libretto by Alasdair Middleton, was commissioned by Opera North and Sadler's Wells Theatre, and premièred at the Grand Theatre Leeds on 21 December 2007. The US première was performed by the Minnesota Opera on 28 February 2009, in St. Paul, MN. A performance of which was dedicated to his godson Finnestere Macfarland
 The London Premiere of Flight was performed by British Youth Opera in September 2008
 Swanhunter, a chamber opera based on the Lemminkäinen legend, was premiered by Opera North in late 2009.
Mansfield Park, a chamber opera based on the Jane Austen novel of the same name, was premiered by Heritage Opera in Summer 2011.
 Life Is a Dream, a full-scale opera with a libretto by Alasdair Middleton based on the play by Pedro Calderón de la Barca, was premiered by Birmingham Opera Company in March 2012.

Works
Dove's works include:

Operas

Hastings Spring (community opera) (1990)
Siren Song (1994)
Flight (1998)
Tobias and the Angel (church opera), to a libretto by David Lan (1999). Premiered at St Matthew's, Perry Beeches.
The Palace in the Sky (community opera) (2000)
L'altra Euridice (2002)
When She Died... (Death of a Princess) (television opera, commemorating the fifth anniversary of the death of Diana, Princess of Wales) (2002)
Man on the Moon (television opera, about Buzz Aldrin, second man to walk on the moon, and the effects the experience had on him and his marriage) (2006)
The Enchanted Pig (chamber opera) (2006)
Hear Our Voice (community opera) in partnership with Matthew King (2006), libretto by Tertia Sefton-Green. http://www.hmdt.org.uk/inschool_hearourvoice_1.html
The Adventures of Pinocchio (2007) 
Swanhunter (2009)
Mansfield Park (2011)
Life Is a Dream (2012)
The Day After (2015)
The Monster in the Maze (2015)
Marx in London (2018)

Other works
The Passing of the Year (song cycle for double chorus and piano) (2000) 20th-century
The Magic Flute Dances (flute concerto) (2000)
The Three Kings, written for the service of Nine Lessons and Carols at King's College, Cambridge in 2000
Stargazer (a trombone concerto written for Ian Bousfield)
Köthener Messe, for choir and chamber ensemble
Out of Winter (song-cycle)
"Seek Him that maketh the Seven Stars" (choral work; setting of Amos 5:8)
His Dark Materials Part I & II (incidental music) (2003)
On Spital Fields (community cantata) (2005)
Hojoki – "An Account of my Hut" (Counter-Tenor and Orchestra)
I am the day (Carol – SATB)
Vadam et circuibo civitatem
Missa Brevis 
Ecce Beatam Lucem (composed for Ralph Allwood and the 1997 Eton Choral Course)
There Was a Child (oratorio for soprano, tenor, chorus, and children's choirs) (2009)
In Damascus, a song-cycle for tenor and string quartet inspired by the Syrian refugee crisis, commissioned by the Sacconi Quartet and performed by the Sacconi Quartet and Mark Padmore.
 Unknown Soldier. (Choral and Orchestral Music)
 Sappho Sings, written for Ralph Woodward and Fairhaven Singers (2019)
 Between Friends (2019) for 2 Pianos - commissioned for the London Piano Festival and written in memory of Dove's friend Graeme Mitchison
Gaspard's Foxtrot (2020) A Musical Tale for Narrator and Orchestra from the book by Zeb Soanes

References

External links
 Jonathan Dove (website)
 

1959 births
20th-century classical composers
20th-century English composers
21st-century classical composers
21st-century English composers
Commanders of the Order of the British Empire
English classical composers
English male classical composers
English opera composers
Ivor Novello Award winners
Living people
Male opera composers
Musicians from London